Ernest Joseph Hyman (1904 – 7 January 1927) was a footballer for Yeovil Town. He died on 7 January 1927 from injuries sustained during a game for the club against Taunton Town on Boxing Day 1926. He is buried in the graveyard of St Nicholas church, Radstock.

His father was a miner in the Somerset Coalfield, and Ernest was the cousin of cricketer and footballer Bill Hyman and three members of his local Radstock Town F.C. team.

References

English footballers
Yeovil Town F.C. players
People from Radstock
1904 births
1927 deaths
Association footballers not categorized by position
Association football players who died while playing
Sport deaths in England